Šućurići  is a village in the municipalities of Novo Goražde, Republika Srpska and Goražde, Bosnia and Herzegovina.

Demographics 
According to the 2013 census, its population was 32, all Bosniaks living in the Goražde part, with no one living in the Novo Goražde part.

References

Populated places in Novo Goražde
Populated places in Goražde